The Techa is an eastward river on the eastern flank of the southern Ural Mountains noted for its nuclear contamination. Its basin is close to and north of the Miass, longer than these rivers apart from the Tobol.

Water pollution

As many as forty villages, with a combined population of about 28,000 residents, lined the river at the time. For 24 of them, the Techa was a major source of water; 23 of them were eventually evacuated. In the past 45 years, about half a million people in the region have been irradiated in one or more of the incidents, exposing them to as much as 20 times the radiation suffered by the Chernobyl disaster victims.

The Tobol is a sub-tributary of the Ob, being linked by the final part of the Irtysh; all three flow generally north.

See also
Pollution of Lake Karachay
 Water pollution
 Plutopia
 Ozyorsk, Chelyabinsk Oblast
 Semipalatinsk Test Site

References 

Rivers of Chelyabinsk Oblast
Rivers of Kurgan Oblast
Nuclear accidents and incidents
Water pollution in Russia
Disasters in the Soviet Union 
Radioactive waste
Waste disposal incidents
1949 disasters in the Soviet Union 
1956 disasters in the Soviet Union 
1940s disasters in the Soviet Union 
1950s disasters in the Soviet Union